Job's Temple is a historic Methodist church building located near Glenville, Gilmer County, West Virginia. It was built between 1860 and 1866, and is a building constructed of poplar log, measuring 18 feet by 24 feet. The building was renovated between 1928 and 1936.  Adjacent to the church is Job's Temple Cemetery, containing 122 graves.

It was listed on the National Register of Historic Places in 1979.

References

Churches on the National Register of Historic Places in West Virginia
Methodist churches in West Virginia
Churches completed in 1860
19th-century Methodist church buildings in the United States
Buildings and structures in Gilmer County, West Virginia
National Register of Historic Places in Gilmer County, West Virginia
Wooden churches in West Virginia